Joseph Leo Dobrigh (6 December 1898 – 17 April 1973) was an Australian rules footballer who played with Melbourne and Richmond in the Victorian Football League (VFL).

Notes

External links 

 
Demonwiki profile

1898 births
1973 deaths
Australian rules footballers from Victoria (Australia)
Melbourne Football Club players
Richmond Football Club players